The Cream City Collectives (CCC) was a volunteer-run collective space located at 732 E. Clarke St. in Milwaukee, Wisconsin. It existed from 2006 until 2012.

Activities
Cream City Collectives hosted the Mathilde Anneke Infoshop, the Milwaukee Screenprinting Collective, the CCC Gallery, and other groups that shared the space for meetings and events. It opened with a storefront in October 2006. The infoshop was named after the German radical Mathilde Anneke, one of the Forty-Eighters who founded the first feminist newspaper in the United States in Milwaukee.

References

External links
 

Anarchist organizations in the United States
Infoshops
Organizations based in Milwaukee
Culture of Milwaukee